An election for Mayor of New York City was held on November 2, 1886.

Candidates included four-term former state assemblyman Theodore Roosevelt, author Henry George, and five-term U.S. Representative Abram Hewitt. Roosevelt, at age 28, would have been the youngest mayor in New York City history had he been elected.

The election saw many Republican voters swing their support to Hewitt.

Results

References

1886
New York City
New York City mayoral
mayoral election
Theodore Roosevelt